Ralph "Sarge" Mitterling (April 19, 1890 – January 22, 1956) was an American football, basketball, and baseball player and coach. He played Major League Baseball as an outfielder for the Philadelphia Athletics during the  season. He served in the US Army during World War I. Mitterling was the head football coach at Ursinus College from 1919 to 1920, at Susquehanna University in 1923, and at East Stroudsburg State Teachers College—now East Stroudsburg University of Pennsylvania—from 1926 to 1935, compiling a career college football record of 47–52–7. He was also the head basketball coach at Ursinus from 1919 to 1921, tallying a mark of 17–28, and the head baseball coach at the University of Pittsburgh from 1939 to 1954, amassing a record of 89–106–1. Mitterling died on January 22, 1956, at Veteran's Hospital in the Oakland section of Pittsburgh, Pennsylvania.

Head coaching record

Football

References

External links
 
 

1890 births
1956 deaths
American football halfbacks
American men's basketball players
Major League Baseball outfielders
Bridgeport Americans players
East Stroudsburg Warriors baseball coaches
East Stroudsburg Warriors football coaches
Pittsburgh Panthers baseball coaches
Philadelphia Athletics players
Springfield Green Sox players
Springfield Pride baseball players
Springfield Pride football players
Susquehanna River Hawks football coaches
Ursinus Bears athletic directors
Ursinus Bears baseball coaches
Ursinus Bears baseball players
Ursinus Bears football coaches
Ursinus Bears football players
Ursinus Bears men's basketball coaches
Ursinus Bears men's basketball players
United States Army personnel of World War I
Baseball players from Pennsylvania
Basketball coaches from Pennsylvania
Basketball players from Pennsylvania
Coaches of American football from Pennsylvania
Players of American football from Pennsylvania